Romanzoffia is a genus of flowering plants in the waterleaf family known as mistmaids or mistmaidens. There are 5 species which are native to western North America from California north to Alaska. Mistmaids may be annual or perennial and low patchy herbs to small bushes, depending on species. They bear attractive bell-shaped white flowers that make them desirable as ornamentals in the appropriate climates.

Species:
Romanzoffia californica - California mistmaiden
Romanzoffia sitchensis - Sitka mistmaiden
Romanzoffia thompsonii - Thompson's mistmaiden
Romanzoffia tracyi - Tracy's mistmaiden
Romanzoffia unalaschcensis - Alaska mistmaiden

External links
Jepson Manual (TJM) treatment of Romanzoffia

Hydrophylloideae
Flora of Western Canada
Flora of the Western United States
Taxa named by Adelbert von Chamisso
Boraginaceae genera